Platinum Asset Management  is an Australian asset management company. It has been publicly traded on the Australian Securities Exchange since 2007. It is a constituent member of both the S&P/ASX 200 and S&P/ASX 300 indexes. In 2019, it was ranked by HFM Global as the largest Hedge Fund group in Australia as well as the second largest in Asia-Pacific.

History 
In 1994, Platinum Asset Management was founded by Kerr Neilson and several others with the financial backing of George Soros. It was founded as a specialist company in international equities.

The success of the company was attributed to the ability to transcend short-term market investment and focus on long-term returns.

In 2007, Platinum Asset Management went public and was listed on the Australian Securities Exchange under the ticker: 'PTM'.

Poor results during the 2012 financial year resulted in a 16 per cent fall in net profit, mainly due to a 14 per cent reduction in investment income. As a result, Neilsen agreed to forego a performance bonus, an increase in his base salary, and neither granted himself nor exercised options.

In 2018, Neilson stepped down as Chief Executive Officer and was replaced by Andrew Clifford who was another co-founder of the company.

Business Overview 

Platinum Asset Management mainly operates a funds management business. The company operates through two segments: funds management, and investments and other. Its product range consists of global, regional and sector products for investment.

It has two investment companies listed on the Australian Securities Exchange which are Platinum Capital Limited and Platinum Asia Investments Limited. In addition it has two listed funds which are Platinum International Fund  and Platinum Asia Fund.

Platinum Asset Management is headquartered in Sydney, Australia with an additional office in London.

As at 28 February 2021, the company has 107 employees which include 31 Investment professionals.

References

External links 

Australian companies established in 1994
Investment companies of Australia
Financial services companies based in Sydney
Financial services companies established in 1994
Companies listed on the Australian Securities Exchange
2007 initial public offerings